The Arab Party for Justice and Equality is a political party that involves Arab tribes from the Sinai and Upper Egypt in the political process.

References

2011 establishments in Egypt
Arab nationalism in Egypt
Arab nationalist political parties
Nationalist parties in Egypt
Political parties established in 2011